NGC 5665 is a spiral galaxy in the constellation of Boötes.

References

External links

Image NGC 5665
Distance 
 SIMBAD Data

Boötes
Intermediate spiral galaxies
5665
09352
51953
049
51953
+01-37-024